Chevrier is a surname. Notable people with the surname include:

 Alain Chevrier, Canadian ice hockey goaltender
 Don Chevrier
 Edgar-Rodolphe-Eugène Chevrier
 Lionel Chevrier
 Jean-François Chevrier

French-language surnames
Occupational surnames